Ali Akhtar Mikrani, was an advisor of the prime minister of Nepal at the tenure of Prime Minister Madhav Kumar Nepal from May 2009 to February 2011. He was an architecture engineer by profession as well as involved in several social works throughout Nepal.
He was recommended as the ambassador of Saudi Arabia for Nepal during the K.P.oli government but later he was withdrawn due to fell-down of the government. He had worked as a member of the construction and planning of Kathmandu Valley under the Government of Nepal.

Early life
He was born at Kattarban village of Rajdevi VDC of Rautahat district in the year 1956 in one of the well-established Muslim family of Nepal. He did his schooling in his village and later studied in India from the renowned engineering institute named "National Institute of Technology, Rourkela". His grandfather Maula Bakhsh Mikrani has once jailed for six months at Nakhu Kathmandu at the time of Rana Prime Minister Chandra Shumsher Jang Bahadur Rana.
His grandfather was also a well-known social activist in the area of Sarlahi and Rautahat district. The "Chaudhry" title honored his grandfather Maula Bakhsh Mikrani by that time Rana government of Nepal as his ancestor died by fighting with British force at Samanpur of Rautahat District is now Murtiya village in Sarlahi district. A large number of drinking water well and public places still can be seen in Sarlahi and Rautahat district made by Maula Bakhsh Chaudhry during his service. His brother Ali Akbar Mikrani is a Former Chief Justice of Appellate Court of Nepal.

Social Activities
He has visited Saudi Arabia during his tenure as prime minister advisor he was well recognized for working for Nepalese migrant workers in Saudi Arabia. He was worked as a consultant of Hajj Committee of Nepal in 2015.

Political Activities
He is aligned with the Communist Party of Nepal (Unified Marxist–Leninist) for more than decades. he also served as secretary of the UML Aetihad committee.

Illness and death
He was tested positive for coronavirus on 24 April 2021 and died on 11 May 2021 due to pneumonia and organ failure at Grande International Hospital, Kathmandu. The Grande International Hospital was blamed by his kins for negligence and miss management in his treatment.

References

1956 births
Living people
Mikrani People of Nepal